The Scout and Guide movement in Eswatini (Swaziland) is served by
 Emavulandlela Swaziland Scout Association (formerly "Swaziland Boy Scouts Association"), member of the World Organization of the Scout Movement
 Eswatini Girl Guides Association, member of the World Association of Girl Guides and Girl Scouts

International Scouting units in Eswatini
In addition, there are American Boy Scouts in Eswatini, serving as Lone Scouts linked to the Direct Service branch of the Boy Scouts of America, which supports units around the world.

See also